Ring Knutstorp is a motor racing circuit in Kågeröd, Sweden. The circuit was built in 1963, extended in 1970, and modified to its present configuration in 1980. During the seventies, rounds of the Formula Three European Cup were held at the circuit, with winners including Alain Prost. Ring Knutstorp hosts rounds of the Scandinavian Touring Car Championship, and is a playable track in the video game STCC – The Game. The track was used during the 1984 European Rallycross Championship season.

Lap records 

The official race lap records at the Ring Knutstorp are listed as:

References

External links 
 

Motorsport venues in Sweden
Buildings and structures in Skåne County
20th-century establishments in Skåne County